The San Angelo Outlaws are a defunct American minor professional ice hockey team that played in the Western Professional Hockey League from 1997 to 2001 and the Central Hockey League in the 2001–02 season. They were based in San Angelo, Texas and played their home games out of the San Angelo Coliseum. The WPHL ceased operations in 2001 and the Central Hockey League absorbed the remaining ten WPHL teams, including the Outlaws. One year later, the team was renamed to the San Angelo Saints.

Season-by-season record

External links
 San Angelo Outlaws (WPHL) at The Internet Hockey Database

Ice hockey teams in Texas
Sports in San Angelo, Texas
Defunct ice hockey teams in Texas
Ice hockey clubs established in 1997
Sports clubs disestablished in 2002
1997 establishments in Texas
2002 disestablishments in Texas